Shyness (also called diffidence) is the feeling of apprehension, lack of comfort, or awkwardness especially when a person is around other people. This commonly occurs in new situations or with unfamiliar people; a shy person may simply opt to avoid these situations. Although shyness can be a characteristic of people who have low self-esteem, the primary defining characteristic of shyness is a fear of what other people will think of a person's behavior. This fear of negative reactions such as being laughed at, humiliated or patronized, criticized or rejected can cause a shy person to retreat. Stronger forms of shyness can be referred to as social anxiety or social phobia.

Origins 

The initial cause of shyness varies. Scientists believe that they have located genetic data supporting the hypothesis that shyness is, at least, partially genetic. However, there is also evidence that suggests the environment in which a person is raised can also be responsible for their shyness. This includes child abuse, particularly emotional abuse such as ridicule. Shyness can originate after a person has experienced a physical anxiety reaction; at other times, shyness seems to develop first and then later causes physical symptoms of anxiety. Shyness differs from social anxiety, which is a broader, often depression-related psychological condition including the experience of fear, apprehension or worrying about being evaluated by others in social situations to the extent of inducing panic.

Shyness may come from genetic traits, the environment in which a person is raised and personal experiences. Shyness may be a personality trait or can occur at certain stages of development in children.

Genetics and heredity 

Shyness is often seen as a hindrance to people and their development. The cause of shyness is often disputed but it is found that fear is positively related to shyness, suggesting that fearful children are much more likely to develop being shy as opposed to children less fearful. Shyness can also be seen on a biological level as a result of an excess of cortisol. When cortisol is present in greater quantities, it is known to suppress an individual's immune system, making them more susceptible to illness and disease. The genetics of shyness is a relatively small area of research that has been receiving an even smaller amount of attention, although papers on the biological bases of shyness date back to 1988. Some research has indicated that shyness and aggression are related—through long and short forms of the gene DRD4, though considerably more research on this is needed.  Further, it has been suggested that shyness and social phobia (the distinction between the two is becoming ever more blurred) are related to obsessive-compulsive disorder. As with other studies of behavioral genetics, the study of shyness is complicated by the number of genes involved in, and the confusion in defining, the phenotype.  Naming the phenotype – and translation of terms between genetics and psychology — also causes problems.

Several genetic links to shyness are current areas of research.  One is the serotonin transporter promoter region polymorphism (5-HTTLPR), the long form of which has been shown to be modestly correlated with shyness in grade school children. Previous studies had shown a connection between this form of the gene and both obsessive-compulsive disorder and autism. Mouse models have also been used, to derive genes suitable for further study in humans; one such gene, the glutamic acid decarboxylase gene (which encodes an enzyme that functions in GABA synthesis), has so far been shown to have some association with behavioral inhibition.

Another gene, the dopamine D4 receptor gene (DRD4) exon III polymorphism, had been the subject of studies in both shyness and aggression and is currently the subject of studies on the "novelty seeking" trait. A 1996 study of anxiety-related traits (shyness being one of these) remarked that, "Although twin studies have indicated that individual variation in measures of anxiety-related personality traits is 40-60% heritable, none of the relevant genes has yet been identified", and that "10 to 15 genes might be predicted to be involved" in the anxiety trait. Progress has been made since then, especially in identifying other potential genes involved in personality traits, but there has been little progress made towards confirming these relationships. The long version of the 5-HTT gene-linked polymorphic region (5-HTTLPR) is now postulated to be correlated with shyness, but in the 1996 study, the short version was shown to be related to anxiety-based traits.

Thalia Eley, professor of developmental behavioural genetics at King's College London, argues that only about 30% of shyness as a trait is genetically inherited, while the rest emerges as a response to the environment.

As a symptom of mercury poisoning 

Excessive shyness, embarrassment, self-consciousness and timidity, social-phobia and lack of self-confidence are also components of erethism, which is a symptom complex that appears in cases of mercury poisoning.

Prenatal development 

The prevalence of shyness in some children can be linked to day length during pregnancy, particularly during the midpoint of prenatal development. An analysis of longitudinal data from children living at specific latitudes in the United States and New Zealand revealed a significant relationship between hours of day length during the midpoint of pregnancy and the prevalence of shyness in children. "The odds of being classified as shy were 1.52 times greater for children exposed to shorter compared to longer daylengths during gestation." In their analysis, scientists assigned conception dates to the children relative to their known birth dates, which allowed them to obtain random samples from children who had a mid-gestation point during the longest hours of the year and the shortest hours of the year (June and December, depending on whether the cohorts were in the United States or New Zealand).

The longitudinal survey data included measurements of shyness on a five-point scale based on interviews with the families being surveyed, and children in the top 25th percentile of shyness scores were identified. The data revealed a significant co-variance between the children who presented as being consistently shy over a two-year period, and shorter day length during their mid-prenatal development period. "Taken together, these estimates indicate that about one out of five cases of extreme shyness in children can be associated with gestation during months of limited daylength."

Low birth weights 

In recent years correlations between birth weight and shyness have been studied. Findings suggest that those born at low birth weights are more likely to be shy, risk-aversive and cautious compared to those born at normal birth weights. These results do not however imply a cause-and-effect relationship.

Personality trait 

Shyness is most likely to occur during unfamiliar situations, though in severe cases it may hinder an individual in their most familiar situations and relationships as well. Shy people avoid the objects of their apprehension in order to keep from feeling uncomfortable and inept; thus, the situations remain unfamiliar and the shyness perpetuates itself.  Shyness may fade with time; e.g., a child who is shy towards strangers may eventually lose this trait when older and become more socially adept. This often occurs by adolescence or young adulthood (generally around the age of 13). In some cases, though, it may become an integrated, lifelong character trait. Longitudinal data suggests that the three different personality types evident in infancy – easy, slow-to-warm-up, and difficult – tend to change as children mature. Extreme traits become less pronounced, and personalities evolve in predictable patterns over time. What has been proven to remain constant is the tendency to internalize or externalize problems. This relates to individuals with shy personalities because they tend to internalize their problems, or dwell on their problems internally instead of expressing their concerns, which leads to disorders like depression and anxiety. Humans experience shyness to different degrees and in different areas.

Shyness can also be seen as an academic determinant. It has been determined that there is a negative relationship between shyness and classroom performance. As the shyness of an individual increased, classroom performance was seen to decrease.

Shyness may involve the discomfort of difficulty in knowing what to say in social situations, or may include crippling physical manifestations of uneasiness. Shyness usually involves a combination of both symptoms, and may be quite devastating for the sufferer, in many cases leading them to feel that they are boring, or exhibit bizarre behavior in an attempt to create interest, alienating them further. Behavioral traits in social situations such as smiling, easily producing suitable conversational topics, assuming a relaxed posture and making good eye contact, may not be second nature for a shy person. Such people might only affect such traits by great difficulty, or they may even be impossible to display.

Those who are shy are perceived more negatively, in cultures that value sociability, because of the way they act towards others. Shy individuals are often distant during conversations, which can result in others forming poor impressions of them and considering them stand-offish, egoist or snobbish. People who are not shy may be up-front, aggressive, or critical towards shy people in an attempt "to get them out of their shell". Even when an attempt to draw out a shy person is conducted in a kindly and well-intentioned manner the exercise may still backfire, as by focusing attention on the individual it increases their self-consciousness and sense of awkwardness.

Concepts

Versus introversion 

The term shyness may be implemented as a lay blanket-term for a family of related and partially overlapping afflictions, including timidity (apprehension in meeting new people), bashfulness and diffidence (reluctance in asserting oneself), apprehension and anticipation (general fear of potential interaction), or intimidation (relating to the object of fear rather than one's low confidence). Apparent shyness, as perceived by others, may simply be the manifestation of reservation or introversion, a character trait which causes an individual to voluntarily avoid excessive social contact or be terse in communication, but are not motivated or accompanied by discomfort, apprehension, or lack of confidence. Introversion is commonly mistaken for shyness. However, introversion is a personal preference, while shyness stems from distress.

Rather, according to professor of psychology Bernardo J. Carducci, introverts choose to avoid social situations because they derive no reward from them or may find surplus sensory input overwhelming, whereas shy people may fear such situations. Research using the statistical techniques of factor analysis and correlation have found shyness overlaps mildly with both introversion and neuroticism (i.e., negative emotionality). Low societal acceptance of shyness or introversion may reinforce a shy or introverted individual's low self-confidence.

Both shyness and introversion can outwardly manifest with socially withdrawn behaviors, such as tendencies to avoid social situations, especially when they are unfamiliar. A variety of research suggests that shyness and introversion possess clearly distinct motivational forces and lead to uniquely different personal and peer reactions and therefore cannot be described as theoretically the same, with Susan Cain's Quiet (2012) further discerning introversion as involving being differently social (preferring one-on-one or small group interactions) rather than being anti-social altogether.

Research suggests that no unique physiological response, such as an increased heart beat, accompanies socially withdrawn behavior in familiar compared with unfamiliar social situations. But unsociability leads to decreased exposure to unfamiliar social situations and shyness causes a lack of response in such situations, suggesting that shyness and unsociability affect two different aspects of sociability and are distinct personality traits. In addition, different cultures perceive unsociability and shyness in different ways, leading to either positive or negative individual feelings of self-esteem. Collectivist cultures view shyness as a more positive trait related to compliance with group ideals and self-control, while perceiving chosen isolation (introverted behavior) negatively as a threat to group harmony; and because collectivist society accepts shyness and rejects unsociability, shy individuals develop higher self-esteem than introverted individuals. On the other hand, individualistic cultures perceive shyness as a weakness and a character flaw, while unsociable personality traits (preference to spend time alone) are accepted because they uphold the value of autonomy; accordingly, shy individuals tend to develop low self-esteem in Western cultures while unsociable individuals develop high self-esteem.

Versus social phobia (social anxiety disorder) 
An extreme case of shyness is identified as a psychiatric illness, which made its debut as social phobia in DSM-III in 1980, but was then described as rare. By 1994, however, when DSM-IV was published, it was given a second, alternative name in parentheses (social anxiety disorder) and was now said to be relatively common, affecting between 3 and 13% of the population at some point during their lifetime. Studies examining shy adolescents and university students found that between 12 and 18% of shy individuals meet criteria for social anxiety disorder.

Shyness affects people mildly in unfamiliar social situations where one feels anxiety about interacting with new people. Social anxiety disorder, on the other hand, is a strong irrational fear of interacting with people, or being in situations which may involve public scrutiny, because one feels overly concerned about being criticized if one embarrasses oneself. Physical symptoms of social phobia can include blushing, shortness of breath, trembling, increased heart rate, and sweating; in some cases, these symptoms are intense enough and numerous enough to constitute a panic attack. Shyness, on the other hand, may incorporate many of these symptoms, but at a lower intensity, infrequently, and does not interfere tremendously with normal living.

Social versus behavioral inhibition 

Those considered shy are also said to be socially inhibited. Social inhibition is the conscious or unconscious constraint by a person of behavior of a social nature. In other words, social inhibition is holding back for social reasons. There are different levels of social inhibition, from mild to severe. Being socially inhibited is good when preventing one from harming another and bad when causing one to refrain from participating in class discussions.

Behavioral inhibition is a temperament or personality style that predisposes a person to become fearful, distressed and withdrawn in novel situations. This personality style is associated with the development of anxiety disorders in adulthood, particularly social anxiety disorder.

Misconceptions and negative aspects 

Many misconceptions/stereotypes about shy individuals exist in Western culture and negative peer reactions to "shy" behavior abound. This takes place because individualistic cultures place less value on quietness and meekness in social situations, and more often reward outgoing behaviors. Some misconceptions include viewing introversion and social phobia synonymous with shyness, and believing that shy people are less intelligent.

Intelligence 

No correlation (positive or negative) exists between intelligence and shyness. Research indicates that shy children have a harder time expressing their knowledge in social situations (which most modern curricula utilize), and because they do not engage actively in discussions teachers view them as less intelligent. In line with social learning theory, an unwillingness to engage with classmates and teachers makes it more difficult for shy students to learn. Test scores, however, indicate that whereas shyness may limit academic engagement, it is unrelated to actual academic knowledge. Depending on the level of a teacher's own shyness, more indirect (vs. socially oriented) strategies may be used with shy individuals to assess knowledge in the classroom, and accommodations made. Observed peer evaluations of shy people during initial meeting and social interactions thereafter found that peers evaluate shy individuals as less intelligent during the first encounter. During subsequent interactions, however, peers perceived shy individuals' intelligence more positively.

Benefits 

Thomas Benton claims that because shy people "have a tendency toward self-criticism, they are often high achievers, and not just in solitary activities like research and writing. Perhaps even more than the drive toward independent achievement, shy people long to make connections to others often through altruistic behavior." Susan Cain describes the benefits that shy people bring to society that US cultural norms devalue. Without characteristics that shy people bring to social interactions, such as sensitivity to the emotions of others, contemplation of ideas, and valuable listening skills, there would be no balance to society. In earlier generations, such as the 1950s, society perceived shyness as a more socially attractive trait, especially in women, indicating that views on shyness vary by culture.

Sociologist Susie Scott challenged the interpretation and treatment of shyness as being pathological. "By treating shyness as an individual pathology, ... we forget that this is also a socially oriented state of mind that is socially produced and managed." She explores the idea that "shyness is a form of deviance: a problem for society as much as for the individual", and concludes that, to some extent, "we are all impostors, faking our way through social life". One of her interview subjects (self-defined as shy) puts this point of view even more strongly: "Sometimes I want to take my cue from the militant disabled lobbyists and say, 'hey, it's not MY problem, it's society's'. I want to be proud to be shy: on the whole, shys are probably more sensitive, and nicer people, than 'normals'. I shouldn't have to change: society should adapt to meet my needs."

Different cultural views 

In cultures that value outspokenness and overt confidence, shyness can be perceived as weakness. To an unsympathetic observer, a shy individual may be mistaken as cold, distant, arrogant or aloof, which can be frustrating for the shy individual. However, in other cultures, shy people may be perceived as being thoughtful, intelligent, as being good listeners, and as being more likely to think before they speak.

In cultures that value autonomy, shyness is often analyzed in the context of being a social dysfunction, and is frequently contemplated as a personality disorder or mental health issue. Some researchers are beginning to study comparisons between individualistic and collectivistic cultures, to examine the role that shyness might play in matters of social etiquette and achieving group-oriented goals. "Shyness is one of the emotions that may serve as behavioral regulators of social relationships in collectivistic cultures. For example, social shyness is evaluated more positively in a collectivistic society, but negatively evaluated in an individualistic society."

In a cross-cultural study of Chinese and Canadian school children, researchers sought to measure several variables related to social reputation and peer relationships, including "shyness-sensitivity." Using peer nomination questionnaire, students evaluated their fellow students using positive and negative playmate nominations. "Shyness-sensitivity was significantly and negatively correlated with measures of peer acceptance in the Canadian sample. Inconsistent with Western results, it was found that items describing shyness-sensitivity were separated from items assessing isolation in the factor structure for the Chinese sample. Shyness-sensitivity was positively associated with sociability-leadership and with peer acceptance in the Chinese sample."

Western perceptions 

In some Western cultures shyness-inhibition plays an important role in psychological and social adjustment. It has been found that shyness-inhibition is associated with a variety of maladaptive behaviors. Being shy or inhibited in Western cultures can result in rejection by peers, isolation and being viewed as socially incompetent by adults. However, research suggests that if social withdrawal is seen as a personal choice rather than the result of shyness, there are fewer negative connotations.

British writer Arthur C. Benson felt shyness is not mere self-consciousness, but a primitive suspicion of strangers, the primeval belief that their motives are predatory, with shyness a sinister quality which needs to be uprooted. He believed the remedy is for the shy to frequent society for courage from familiarity. Also, he claimed that too many shy adults take refuge in a critical attitude, engaging in brutal onslaughts on inoffensive persons. He felt that a better way is for the shy to be nice, to wonder what others need and like, interest in what others do or are talking about, friendly questions, and sympathy.

For Charles Darwin shyness was an 'odd state of mind'  appearing to offer no benefit to our species, and since the 1970s the modern tendency in psychology has been to see shyness as pathology. However, evolutionary survival advantages of careful temperaments over adventurous temperaments in dangerous environments have also been recognized.

Eastern perceptions  
In Eastern cultures shyness-inhibition in school-aged children is seen as positive and those that exhibit these traits are viewed well by peers and are accepted. They tend to be seen as competent by their teachers, to perform well in school and to show well-being. Shy individuals are also more likely to attain leadership status in school. Being shy or inhibited does not correlate with loneliness or depression as in the West. In Eastern cultures, being shy and inhibited is perceived as a sign of politeness, respectfulness, and thoughtfulness.

Examples of shyness and inhibition 

In Hispanic cultures shyness and inhibition with authority figures is common. For instance, Hispanic students may feel shy towards being praised by teachers in front of others, because in these cultures students are rewarded in private with a touch, a smile, or spoken word of praise. Hispanic students may seem shy when they are not. It is considered rude to excel over peers and siblings; therefore it is common for Hispanic students to be reserved in classroom settings. Adults also show reluctance to share personal matters about themselves to authority figures such as nurses and doctors.

Cultures in which the community is closed and based on agriculture (Kenya, India, etc.) experience lower social engagement than those in more open communities (United States, Okinawa, etc.) where interactions with peers are encouraged. Children in Mayan, Indian, Mexican, and Kenyan cultures are less expressive in social styles during interactions and they spend little time engaged in socio-dramatic activities. They are also less assertive in social situations. Self-expression and assertiveness in social interactions are related to shyness and inhibition in that when one is shy or inhibited one exhibits little or no expressive tendencies. Assertiveness is demonstrated in the same way, being shy and inhibited lessen one's chances of being assertive because of a lack of confidence.

In Italian culture emotional expressiveness during interpersonal interaction is encouraged. From a young age children engage in debates or discussions that encourage and strengthen social assertiveness. Independence and social competence during childhood is also promoted. Being inhibited is looked down upon and those who show this characteristic are viewed negatively by their parents and peers. Like other cultures where shyness and inhibition is viewed negatively, peers of shy and inhibited Italian children reject the socially fearful, cautious and withdrawn. These withdrawn and socially fearful children express loneliness and believe themselves to be lacking the social skills needed in social interactions.

Intervention and treatment 

Psychological methods and pharmaceutical drugs are commonly used to treat shyness in individuals who feel crippled because of low self-esteem and psychological symptoms, such as depression or loneliness.  According to research, early intervention methods that expose shy children to social interactions involving team work, especially team sports, decrease their anxiety in social interactions and increase their all around self-confidence later on. Implementing such tactics could prove to be an important step in combating the psychological effects of shyness that make living normal life difficult for anxious individuals.

One important aspect of shyness is social skills development. If schools and parents implicitly assume children are fully capable of effective social interaction, social skills training is not given any priority (unlike reading and writing). As a result, shy students are not given an opportunity to develop their ability to participate in class and interact with peers. Teachers can model social skills and ask questions in a less direct and intimidating manner in order to gently encourage shy students to speak up in class, and make friends with other children.

See also 

 Boldness
 Camera shyness
 Haya (Islam) 
 People skills
 Selective mutism
 Avoidant personality disorder
 Highly sensitive person
 Medicalization of behaviors as illness

References

Further reading

External links 

 
 Lynn Henderson and Philip Zimbardo: "Shyness".  Entry in Encyclopedia of Mental Health, Academic Press, San Diego, CA  (in press)
 Liebowitz Social Anxiety Scale (LSAS-SR)

 
Emotions
Interpersonal relationships